Raban may refer to:

Raban (drum), a one-sided traditional drum type used mainly in Sri Lanka
Raban, historical name of Araban
Battle of Raban, an engagement fought in autumn 958 near Araban
Raban of Helmstatt (born 1362), German bishop
Jonathan Raban (1942-2023), British travel writer and novelist
Ze'ev Raban, Israeli artist
Raban Adelmann (1912–1992), German politician of the Christian Democratic Union

See also
Rabban (disambiguation)
Paco Rabanne (born 1934), Spanish fashion designer of Basque origin 
Raaban, artistic name of Robbin Söderlund, (born 1987), Swedish DJ and music producer
Rabanus Maurus (c. 780–856), also known as Hrabanus or Rhabanus, a Frankish Benedictine monk and theologian, archbishop and saint